Tioga Centre General Store is a historic general store located at 3019 Rt 17 C Tioga Center in Tioga County, New York.  It was built about 1849 and is a two-story, frame structure on an irregular coursed stone foundation. The building reflects the typical Greek Revival, front gabled style of commercial building popular in the mid-19th century.

It was listed on the National Register of Historic Places in 2003.

It is the oldest commercial building in Tioga County, NY.  It is now occupied by an antique store, "Tioga Centre General Store Antiques and Collectibles".  The store is operated by Fran Antalek.  The store hours are Thursday - Sunday 10 - 5.

References

Commercial buildings on the National Register of Historic Places in New York (state)
Commercial buildings completed in 1849
Buildings and structures in Tioga County, New York
1849 establishments in New York (state)
National Register of Historic Places in Tioga County, New York